Franck Junillon (born 28 November 1978 in Montpellier) is a French team handball player. He played on the France men's national handball team which won gold medals at the 2009 World Men's Handball Championship in Croatia.

References

French male handball players
1978 births
Living people
Montpellier Handball players